Mark Anthony Beesley (born 5 December 1980) is an English former footballer who played as a striker. He is currently manager at Warrington Town having previously been assistant manager.

Career
Born in Burscough, Lancashire, Beesley began his career at the youth system of Preston North End before signing a professional contract on 26 June 1999. He subsequently spent three and a half seasons at Chester City. Beesley scored 16 times in the 2001–02 season to help Chester avoid relegation from the Football Conference, but by the start of the 2003–04 he was out of favour with manager Mark Wright. After a spell out on loan at Southport, Beesley was allowed to join Chester's title rivals Hereford United in December 2003.

Beesley made 15 appearances for the club, scoring in Hereford's record-equalling 9–0 win over Dagenham & Redbridge, and against his former club in the 2–1 win over Chester. However, by this point Chester had sealed the Football Conference title at Hereford's expense and Beesley was to lose out in the play-offs to Aldershot Town.

He joined Forest Green Rovers on 8 June 2004 where he was initially unlucky with injuries, missing nearly an entire season with a knee injury. In August 2006 he returned to the north-west for a loan spell with Lancaster City, before returning to Forest Green, where he struck up a strong partnership with the prolific Stuart Fleetwood.

He signed for Cambridge United in January 2008 for a five-figure fee but never really enjoyed the form he had in his later stages at Forest Green. He was loaned to Chester City and AFC Telford United before being released by Cambridge manager Martin Ling at the end of the 2009–10 season.

He signed for newly promoted Conference Premier side Fleetwood Town on 29 July 2010. He joined fellow Conference Premier team York City on a one-month loan on 5 October and he made his debut later that day in a 1–0 defeat to Kettering Town. Beesley returned to Fleetwood early on 1 November after York manager Gary Mills decided to cut his loan short. He then joined Altrincham on loan until 3 January 2011 on 26 November and he made his debut a day later in a 4–0 defeat at Cambridge. After his loan spell expired, he signed permanently for Altrincham but was released at the end of the season.

In July 2011, Beesley signed for Northern Premier League Premier Division side Burscough, in his home town. He moved to promotion challenging Hednesford Town on 6 January 2012. He ended the 2011–12 season with Hednesford but left the club at the end of the season.

In June 2012, Beesley signed for Northern Premier League Premier Division outfit Nantwich Town. He left Nantwich on loan in October 2012 however and joined Warrington Town of the Northern Premier League Division One North and made his club debut on 30 October in a match against Ramsbottom United. In his next match, he scored his first goal for the club, as they beat Harrogate Railway Athletic 4–0 at home.

In February 2013, Beesley was released by Nantwich and later that month signed for Northern Premier League Division One North side Skelmersdale United. He left a few weeks later to join West Lancashire Football League Division One club Burscough Richmond in late February 2013.

Coaching
Beesley was managing Burscough in 2016, but left in June of that year. He later joined Warrington Town as assistant manager to Paul Carden whilst also coaching at an academy run by Robbie Fowler. Beesley was appointed manager in December 2021, after Carden left to manage another club.

Career statistics

References

External links

1980 births
Living people
People from Burscough
Footballers from Lancashire
English footballers
Association football forwards
Preston North End F.C. players
Chester City F.C. players
Southport F.C. players
Hereford United F.C. players
Forest Green Rovers F.C. players
Lancaster City F.C. players
Cambridge United F.C. players
AFC Telford United players
Fleetwood Town F.C. players
York City F.C. players
Altrincham F.C. players
Burscough F.C. players
Hednesford Town F.C. players
Nantwich Town F.C. players
Warrington Town F.C. players
Skelmersdale United F.C. players
English Football League players
National League (English football) players
Northern Premier League players
Warrington Town F.C. managers
English football managers